The State Government Affairs Council (SGAC) was created in 1975 by government affairs executives of major corporations to provide support to several major United States non-governmental organizations,  including the Council of State Governments, the National Conference of State Legislatures and the American Legislative Exchange Council (ALEC).

SGAC always meets during major CSG and NCSL meetings, as well as it holds its own separate meetings.  It is led by a president elected among its members to a one-year term and an Executive Director, who serves at the pleasure of its executive committee.

SGAC Past Presidents and affiliation during term

2006-07 - Katja Zastrow, Anheuser-Busch

2005-06 - Thomas Langan, Unilever

2004-05 - Janet Lamkin, California Bankers Association

2003-04 - Jeff Lane, Procter & Gamble

2002-03 - Maureen Riehl, National Retail Federation

2001-02 - Jean Cantrell, Circuit City

2000-01 - H. C. "Pete" Poynter, BellSouth

1999-00 - John Burke, Foodservice and Packaging Institute

1998-99 - Dennis Brown, Equipment Leasing Association

1997-98 - O. Keith Owen III, BP America

1996-97 - Evelyn Jarvis-Ferris, Shaklee Corporation

1995-96 - Michael A. Donahue, McDonald's Corporation

1994-95 - John H. Brown, Amway Corporation

1993-94 - D.J. "Jack" Brewer, Olin Corporation

1992-93 - Linda A. Adams, AT&T

1991-92 - John T. Gould, Jr., Unilever

1990-91 - Alan B. Smith, Nationwide Insurance

1989-90 - R. Parker Sherrill, HealthTrust

1988-89 - Freeman H. Smith, Corning Incorporated

1987-88 - Alan W. Koppes, Procter & Gamble

1986-87 - Wayne I. Campbell, NFIB

1977-78 - Robert J. Grimm, Avon Products, Inc.

1976-77 - W. Alan Luce, Tupperware

1975-76 -  Charles S. Mack, CPC North America

Political organizations based in the United States
Organizations established in 1975